Eduard Soghomonyan (born 19 February 1990) is an Armenian-born heavyweight Greco-Roman wrestler. He competed for Brazil at the 2016 Summer Olympics, but was eliminated in the first bout.

He represented Brazil at the 2020 Summer Olympics held in Tokyo, Japan. He competed in the men's 130 kg event.

He won the silver medal in his event at the 2022 Pan American Wrestling Championships held in Acapulco, Mexico. He competed in the 130kg event at the 2022 World Wrestling Championships held in Belgrade, Serbia.

References

External links 
 

1990 births
Living people
Olympic wrestlers of Brazil
Wrestlers at the 2016 Summer Olympics
Brazilian male sport wrestlers
Brazilian people of Armenian descent
Sportspeople from Yerevan
Ethnic Armenian sportspeople
Wrestlers at the 2020 Summer Olympics
21st-century Brazilian people